Rev. William Holmes Borders, Sr (24 February 1905 – 23 November 1993) was a civil rights activist and leader and pastor of Wheat Street Baptist Church in Atlanta, Georgia from 1937 to 1988.

Borders' influence in the black community was the trigger for a local radio station to offer him a weekly program in 1940. Listeners of both races tuned in to hear information about segregation, disfranchisement, patriotism (this was during World War II), and black migration to the north. The program became the second-highest-rated broadcast in Atlanta.

Borders had a significant influence on the life of Martin Luther King Jr. Borders's oral presentation and expression accompanied by bodily gesture and physical movement could be seen in the sermons of Dr. King.

During bus desegregation in Atlanta, Borders sat in the front of a bus and was arrested. He formed the Wheat Street Credit Union to provide low-interest loans to blacks. Three times in the 1960s and 1970s, Borders ran for the Georgia House of Representatives but failed.

Borders Sr. was the father of William Holmes Border, Jr., and the grandfather of Lisa Borders, member of the Atlanta City Council and one-time candidate for mayor of Atlanta in the 2009 election.

References

External links
 

Activists for African-American civil rights
Southern Baptist ministers
African-American Baptist ministers
People from Atlanta
1905 births
1993 deaths
Burials at South-View Cemetery
20th-century African-American people
20th-century Baptist ministers from the United States